Rewind is a best-of collection released by German synthpop group Camouflage. The record was released on November 12, 2001 by Polydor.

Overview
The album was the first compilation of theirs in which the group were able to contribute their ideas for song inclusions and input. It features not just singles, but also some album tracks. The 1999 single "Thief" was not included.

Track listing

Credits
Compiled By – Gunther Buskies, Oliver Kreyssig 
Graphic Design – Oliver Kreyssig 
Lyrics – Heiko Maile (tracks: 7, 12, 13, 16), Marcus Meyn (tracks: 1 to 4, 6 to 10, 12 to 18), Nia Neutron (tracks: 10, 17), Oliver Kreyssig (tracks: 1, 5), Peter Godwin (tracks: 1) 
Music By – Heiko Maile (tracks: 1, 3, 4, 7 to 10, 12 to 18), Ingo Ito (tracks: 17), Marcus Meyn (tracks: 2, 6, 7, 9, 12 to 14, 16 to 18), Oliver Kreyssig (tracks: 5, 9, 18) 
Photography – Ross Anania 
Producer – Axel Henninger (tracks: 1, 2, 4, 9, 14, 18), Camouflage (tracks: 1, 2, 4 to 7, 9, 14, 16, 18), Colin Thurston (tracks: 7, 16), Dan Lacksman (tracks: 3, 5, 6, 8, 10, 15, 17), Heiko Maile (tracks: 3, 8, 10 to 13, 15, 17)

References

2001 compilation albums
Camouflage (band) albums